Dolington is an unincorporated community in Upper Makefield Township in Bucks County, Pennsylvania, United States. Dolington is located at the intersection of Pennsylvania Route 532 and Dolington Road.

See also
Dolington Village Historic District

References

Unincorporated communities in Bucks County, Pennsylvania
Unincorporated communities in Pennsylvania